Princess Virginia Maria Clara von und zu Fürstenberg (Virginia Maria Clara Prinzessin von und zu Fürstenberg; born 5 October 1974) is an Italian artist, poet, filmmaker, and fashion designer.

Early life and family 
Princess Virginia von Fürstenberg was born in Genoa, Italy on 5 October 1974 to Prince Sebastian zu Fürstenberg and Elisabetta Guarnati. She is a member of the House of Fürstenberg. Her paternal grandparents were Prince Tassilo zu Fürstenberg and Clara Agnelli. She is a niece of actress Princess Ira von Fürstenberg and fashion designer Prince Egon von Fürstenberg, the ex-husband of Diane von Fürstenberg. Von Fürstenberg is a first cousin of Prince Alexandre von Fürstenberg, Tatiana von Fürstenberg, Prince Hubertus of Hohenlohe-Langenburg, and the late Prince Christoph of Hohenlohe-Langenburg.

Career 
Von Fürstenberg is a fashion designer and creator of the fashion label Virginia Von Zu Furstenberg. She made her fashion debut in March 2011 at the Teatro Filodrammatici in Milan. Her first collection was sold exclusively at boutiques in Milan, Florence, and Rome. In September 2011 Von Fürstenberg debuted a theatrical work titled DISMORPHOPHOBIA that combined spoken word, fashion, film, movement and dance. She debuted her second collection at Milano Moda Donna in Milan on 23 September 2011. She also writes poetry, and has combined her poetry and fashion design in some of her work.

In 2012 Von Fürstenberg collaborated with Tommaso Trak to shoot a film focusing on the life of her great-grandmother, Virginia Bourbon del Monte. In 2017 Von Fürstenberg created an art installation dedicated to her mother titled There was a nice home, which was displayed at the Grossetti Arte Gallery in Venice.

Personal life 
Von Fürstenberg married Baron Alexandre Csillaghy de Pacsér, a Hungarian nobleman, in 1992. Their son, Baron Miklós Tassilo Csillaghy, is an equestrian. Their daughter, Baroness Ginevra Csillaghy, has modeled for the Virginia Von Zu Furstenberg fashion line. She and Csillaghy de Pacsér divorced in 2003. In 2002, a year before her divorce was finalized, she gave birth to a daughter, Clara Bacco Dondi dall'Orologio, from her relationship with Giovanni Bacco Dondi dall'Orologio. In 2004 she married Paco Polenghi with whom she had two children, Otto Leone Maria Polenghi and Santiago Polenghi. Von Fürstenberg and Polenghi later divorced. On October 28th, 2017 she married Janusz Gawronski, descending from a noble and ancient Polish family. Later in 2020 they divorced.

References 

Living people
1974 births
Virginia
Austrian baronesses
Agnelli family
Italian people of German descent
Italian socialites
Italian fashion designers
Italian women fashion designers
Italian filmmakers
Italian women artists
Italian women poets
Nobility from Genoa
Italian contemporary artists
Artists from Genoa
Businesspeople from Genoa